Baron Whaddon may refer to:

Derek Page, Baron Whaddon (1927–2005), British life peer and politician
George Villiers, 1st Duke of Buckingham (1592–1628), who held the title Baron Whaddon before becoming Duke of Buckingham

Extinct baronies in the Peerage of England
Noble titles created in 1619
Noble titles created in 1978
Noble titles created for UK MPs